Brett Kearney (born 29 September 1983 in Sydney, New South Wales), also known by the nickname of "BK", is an Australian professional rugby league footballer formerly with the Bradford Bulls in the Super League, now currently playing for the Collegians in the Illawarra Rugby League competition. A utility back, he has represented Country Origin and previously played for the South Sydney Rabbitohs and Cronulla.

Biography

Early career
Kearney's Junior Club was the Kincumber Colts, on the Central Coast. Kearney was recruited to play with the North Sydney Bears in the Harold Matthews Cup and S.G. Ball Cup before he moved on to South Sydney in 2003.

2003-2005
Kearney made his First Grade Debut in round 1 of the 2003 NRL season for South Sydney against the Canterbury-Bankstown Bulldogs at Telstra Stadium.  Kearney made a total of 28 appearances for South Sydney as the club struggled towards the bottom of the table finishing last in 2003 and 2004.

2006-2014
Signing with the Cronulla-Sutherland Sharks, Kearney had limited opportunity in 2006, with the exception of injuries. In 2007, with a positional change to fullback, Kearney was a regular in the first grade side until he suffered injury during the season. At fullback, "BK" has made inroads in attack scoring several tries. He scored a superb hat trick in the 2007 game against St. George Illawarra Dragons showing his ability in attack.
In 2008, Kearney was selected to play in the annual City vs Country match.  At club level, Kearney made 20 appearances for Cronulla in the 2008 NRL season and scored 10 tries as the club reached the preliminary final but were defeated 28-0 by Melbourne at the Sydney Football Stadium.

In the 2009 NRL season, Kearney suffered a season-ending injury in round 1.

In 2010, he joined Super League club Bradford. After featuring for the at stand-off at the start of his Bulls career he was shifted to his natural position of full back midway through the 2010 season. After Mick Potter took over, Kearney featured almost exclusively as a full back in 2011.

In 2011, Kearney signed a new three-year deal with Bradford.

Return to Australia
In 2015, following five seasons in the Super League, Kearney returned to Australia after being linked to Illawarra Coal League team, the Collegians.

In 2018, Kearney returned to his junior club the Kincumber Colts.

Year Breakdown with the Bradford Bulls:

(For 2014 Super League season highlights, stats and results click on 2014 Super League season results)

References

External links
Brett Kearney Official Player Profile
Brett Kearney NRL Profile

1983 births
Australian rugby league players
Bradford Bulls players
Cronulla-Sutherland Sharks players
South Sydney Rabbitohs players
Country New South Wales Origin rugby league team players
Rugby league fullbacks
Rugby league five-eighths
Living people